This is a list containing the Billboard Hot Latin Tracks number-ones of 1991.

References

United States Latin Songs
1991
1991 in Latin music